Michael P. Mullin (born October 18, 1981), known as Mike Mullin, is a former assistant Commonwealth’s Attorney for the City of Hampton and an American politician of the Democratic Party. Since 2016, he has represented (part-time) the 93rd district in the Virginia House of Delegates.

Early life and education
Mullin graduated from Wilbert Tucker Woodson High School in Fairfax, Virginia where he was active in theatre and speech and debate. He traveled to Virginia's Hampton Roads region for his college education, graduating from Christopher Newport University in 2004. He then studied law at Catholic University in Washington, D.C., graduating with a J.D. from the Columbus School of Law. He has three sons and is active in the Christopher Newport University alumni association.

Career
After admission to the Virginia bar, Mullin worked as an assistant prosecutor in Hampton, Virginia. He became active in the Virginia Bar Association and the Virginia Association of Commonwealth's Attorneys. The Virginia Gang Investigator's association has also named him a Certified Gang Investigator.

In November 2016, Mullin defeated Republican Heather Cordasco in a special election to fill the seat once held by Democrat Monty Mason, who won election to the Virginia Senate in another special election occasioned by the death of John Miller. Mullin also defeated Cordasco in the general elections in November 2017 and November 2019. The 93rd district covers parts of James City County, York County, Williamsburg, and Newport News.

In the Virginia House, Mullin serves as vice chair of the Rules Committee, as well as the Labor and Commerce Committee and the Courts of Justice Committee. Mullin shortly after his election sponsored "Heaven's law" to protect children from child abuse; on December 30, 2019 he introduced two bills for the upcoming session concerning protocols for referring schoolchildren to criminal justice authorities.  Mullin currently chairs a key subcommittee that can conduct hearings for rewriting Virginia's criminal code. On March 12, 2020, he noted progressive reforms passed in the current Virginia legislative session, which passed legislation offering additional protections for 14 and 15 year old defendants, as well as ending drivers license suspensions for unpaid fees and fines, raising the felony threshold to $1000, decriminalizing some marijuana offenses, reforming criminal discovery effective in the summer, expanding deferral options for certain misdemeanors, opening parole opportunities for certain "Fishback" defendants, and allowing jurors to be told about criminal punishment ranges.

Electoral history

References

External links

1981 births
Living people
Democratic Party members of the Virginia House of Delegates
Christopher Newport University alumni
Politicians from Falls Church, Virginia
Politicians from Suffolk, Virginia
Columbus School of Law alumni
21st-century American politicians
Wilbert Tucker Woodson High School alumni